Hanna Schygulla (born 25 December 1943) is a German actress and chanson singer associated with the theater and film director Rainer Werner Fassbinder. She first worked for Fassbinder in 1965 and became an active participant in the New German Cinema. Schygulla won the 1979 Berlin Silver Bear for Best Actress for Fassbinder's The Marriage of Maria Braun, and the 1983 Cannes Film Festival Award for Best Actress for the Marco Ferreri film The Story of Piera.

Early life

Schygulla was born in Königshütte (now Chorzów, Poland) to German parents Antonie ( Mzyk) and Joseph Schygulla. Both the names Schygulla (also spelled Szyguła) and Mzyk are of Polish/Silesian origin. Her father, a timber merchant by profession, was drafted as an infantryman in the German Army and was captured by American forces in Italy, subsequently being held as a prisoner of war until 1948. In 1945, Schygulla and her mother arrived as refugees in Munich, following the expulsion of the majority German-speaking population of Königshütte by Communist Poland. Much later, in the 1960s, Schygulla studied Romance languages and German studies, while taking acting lessons in Munich during her spare time.

Career

Acting eventually became her focus, and she became particularly known for her film work with Rainer Werner Fassbinder. During the making of Effi Briest (1974), an adaptation of a German novel by Theodor Fontane, Fassbinder and Schygulla fell out over divergent interpretations of the character. Another issue for Schygulla was low pay, and she led a revolt against Fassbinder during the making of Effi Briest, shot in September 1972 some time before its commercial release. His response was typically blunt: "I can't stand the sight of your face any more. You bust my balls". They did not work together again for several years until The Marriage of Maria Braun in 1978. The film was entered into the 29th Berlin International Film Festival, where she won the Silver Bear for Best Actress for her performance. In 1980 she acted in Fassbinder's miniseries adaptation of Berlin Alexanderplatz.

Schygulla starred alongside Bruno Ganz in Volker Schlöndorff's Circle of Deceit (1981), and with Isabelle Huppert in Jean-Luc Godard's Passion (1982). She was a member of the jury at the 15th Moscow International Film Festival in 1987.

In the 1990s, she became a chanson singer. In Juliane Lorenz's documentary film Life, Love and Celluloid (1998), on Fassbinder and related topics, Schygulla performs several songs.

Schygulla appeared in the Béla Tarr film Werckmeister Harmonies (2000), and in VB51 (2002), a performance by the artist Vanessa Beecroft. Five years later, she appeared in the film The Edge of Heaven, directed by Fatih Akın. She also appeared in Rosa von Praunheim's film Fassbinder's Women (2000).

In 2007, she received the Honorary Award from the Antalya Golden Orange Film Festival and in 2010 she received the Honorary Golden Bear from the Berlin Film Festival. She acted in the Alexander Sokurov film Faust (2011) and in the French drama film The Prayer (2018) by Cédric Kahn. It was screened in the main competition section at the 68th Berlin International Film Festival.

Schygulla lived in Paris from 1981 to 2014, when she left for Berlin.

Filmography

 Hunting Scenes from Bavaria (1969), as Paula
 Love is Colder than Death (1969), as Johanna
 Katzelmacher (1969), as Marie
 Kuckucksei im Gangsternest (1969), as Maria
 Gods of the Plague (1970), as Johanna Reiher
 Why Does Herr R. Run Amok? (1970), as Hanna
  (1970, TV film), as Johanna
 Rio das Mortes (1971, TV film), as Hanna
 Mathias Kneissl (1971), as Mathilde Schreck
  (1971, TV film), as Berta
 Whity (1971), as Hanna
 Beware of a Holy Whore (1971), as Hanna, actress
 Jakob von Gunten (1971, TV film), as Lisa Benjamenta
 The Merchant of Four Seasons (1972), as Anna Epp / Hans's single sister
 The Bitter Tears of Petra von Kant (1972), as Karin Thimm
 Eight Hours Don't Make a Day (1972–1973, TV miniseries), as Marion Andreas
 Effi Briest (1974), as Effi Briest
 The Wrong Move (1975), as Therese Farner
 The Clown (1976), as Marie
 The Marriage of Maria Braun (1979), as Maria Braun
 The Third Generation (1979), as Susanne Gast
  (1979, TV miniseries), as Frau Piesch
 Berlin Alexanderplatz (1980, TV miniseries), as Eva
 Lili Marleen (1981), as Willie
 Circle of Deceit (1981), as Ariane Nassar
 That Night in Varennes (1982), as Countess Sophie de la Borde
 Passion (1982), as Hanna
 Antonieta (1982), as Anna
 The Story of Piera (1983), as Eugenia
 Sheer Madness (1983), as Olga
 A Love in Germany (1983), as Paulina Kropp
 The Future is Woman (1984), as Anna
 Peter the Great (1986, TV miniseries), as Catherine Skevronskaya
 The Delta Force (1986), as Ingrid Harding (Stewardess)
 Casanova (1987, TV film), as Casanova's Mother
 Forever, Lulu (1987), as Elaine
 Miss Arizona (1988), as Rozsnyai Mici
 The Summer of Miss Forbes (1989, TV film), as Mrs. Forbes
 Abraham's Gold (1990), as Barbara 'Bärbel' Hunzinger
 Aventure de Catherine C. (1990), as Fanny Hohenstein
 Dead Again (1991), as Inga
 Golem, l'esprit de l'exil (1992), as L'Esprit de l'Exil
 Warsaw – Year 5703 (1992), as Stefania Bukowska
 Gibellina, Metamorphosis of a Melody (1992)
 Madame Bäurin (1993), as Tante Agathe
 The Blue Exile (1993), as The Actress
 Golem, le jardin pétrifié (1993), as Michelle
 Aux petits bonheurs (1993), as Lena
 Hey Stranger (1994), as Tania
 A Hundred and One Nights (1995), as La seconde ex-épouse de M. Cinéma
 Pakten (1995), as Ewa Loehwe
 Lea (1996), as Wanda
 Metamorphosis of a Melody (1996), as Spirit of Exile
 Chronique (1997), as La femme du restaurant
 The Girl of Your Dreams (1998), as Magda Goebbels
 Black Out p.s. Red Out (1998), as Martha
 Hanna Schygulla Sings (1999)
 Werckmeister Harmonies (2000), as Tünde Eszter
 Promised Land (2004), as Hanna
 Die blaue Grenze (2005), as Frau Marx
 Vendredi ou un autre jour (2005), as La dame patronnesse de l'équipage
 Winter Journey (2006), as Martha "Mucky" Brenninger
 The Edge of Heaven (2007), as Susanne / Lotte's mother
 Faust (2011), as Moneylender's 'Wife'
 Avanti (2002), as Suzanne
 Lullaby to My Father (2012)
 Vijay and I (2013), as Will's mother
 The Quiet Roar (2014), as Eva
 Unless (2016), as Danielle Westerman
 Fortunata (2017), as Lotte
 The Prayer (2018), as Soeur Myriam
 The Mystery of Henri Pick (2019), as Ludmila Blavitsky
 Everything Went Fine (2021)
 Peter von Kant (2022)

References

External links

1943 births
Living people
Best Actress German Film Award winners
German film actresses
Cannes Film Festival Award for Best Actress winners
Golden Orange Honorary Award winners
Honorary Golden Bear recipients
Officers Crosses of the Order of Merit of the Federal Republic of Germany
People from Chorzów
People from the Province of Upper Silesia
Silver Bear for Best Actress winners
German women singers
German expatriates in France
Actresses from Paris
Singers from Paris
20th-century French actresses
21st-century French actresses
20th-century German actresses
21st-century German actresses